The Gospel According to Matthew & Michael is an album by American jazz pianist Matthew Shipp, which was recorded in 2014 and released on Relative Pitch. It was the first recording featuring his Chamber Ensemble, a trio with Michael Bisio on bass and Mat Maneri on viola. Shipp led in the late 1990s and early 2000s a similar group with Maneri and bassist William Parker: the String Trio, who recorded the albums By the Law of Music and Expansion, Power, Release.

Reception

The Down Beat review by Bradley Bambarger states "The 15 'chapters' of Shipp’s archly titled yet intense, interior suite don’t offer much of a journey in terms of color—this hour of music ranges from austerely ruminative to evocative of angst in the manner of postwar high modernism."

In a review for Tiny Mix Tapes, Clifford Allen says "The Gospel According to Matthew and Michael is of a piece with much of Shipp’s work, as it focuses on multivalent communication between individuals to create a group language that is both singular and partial."

Track listing
 "Chapter 1" – 4:22
 "Chapter 2" – 2:03
 "Chapter 3" – 2:24
 "Chapter 4" – 4:33
 "Chapter 5" – 2:20
 "Chapter 6" – 3:57
 "Chapter 7" – 2:35
 "Chapter 8" – 6:57
 "Chapter 9" – 3:02
 "Chapter 10" – 2:36
 "Chapter 11" – 5:55
 "Chapter 12" – 3:00
 "Chapter 13" – 4:02
 "Chapter 14" – 8:16
 "Chapter 15" – 4:40

Personnel
Matthew Shipp - piano
Michael Bisio – bass
Mat Maneri – viola

References

2015 albums
Matthew Shipp albums